Sphingobium japonicum is a hexachlorocyclohexane-degrading bacteria with type strain MTCC 6362T (=CCM 7287T). Its genome has been sequenced.

References

Further reading

External links

LPSN
Type strain of Sphingobium japonicum at BacDive -  the Bacterial Diversity Metadatabase

Sphingomonadales
Bacteria described in 2005